Kars Harakani Airport is a public airport in Kars, Turkey .

History
In 2006, Kars Airport served 2,352 aircraft and 270,052 passengers. The airport was closed in the spring and summer months of 2007 for renovation works. The re-opening took place on 22 October 2007. The new terminal was designed by architect Yakup Hazan.

Airlines and destinations

Traffic Statistics 

(*)Source: DHMI.gov.tr

References

External links

 

Airports in Turkey
Buildings and structures in Kars Province
1988 establishments in Turkey
Transport in Kars Province